The three teams in this group played against each other on a home-and-away basis. The group winner qualified for the seventh FIFA World Cup held in Chile.

Standings

Matches

References

External links
FIFA official page
RSSSF - 1962 World Cup Qualification
Allworldcup

4
1961 in Soviet football
1960–61 in Turkish football
1961–62 in Turkish football
1961 in Norwegian football